The Iron Mask is a 1929 American part-talkie adventure film directed by Allan Dwan. It is an adaptation of the last section of the 1847-1850 novel The Vicomte de Bragelonne by Alexandre Dumas, père, which is itself based on the French legend of the Man in the Iron Mask.

Cast
Douglas Fairbanks – D'Artagnan
Belle Bennett – The Queen Mother
Marguerite De La Motte – Constance Bonacieux
Dorothy Revier – Milady de Winter
Vera Lewis – Madame Peronne
Rolfe Sedan – Louis XIII
William Bakewell – Louis XIV/Twin Brother
Gordon Thorpe – Young Prince/Twin Brother
Nigel De Brulier – Cardinal Richelieu
Ullrich Haupt – Count De Rochefort
Lon Poff – Father Joseph: the Queen's Confessor
Charles Stevens – Planchet: D'Artagnan's Servant
Henry Otto – the King's Valet
Leon Bary – Athos
Tiny Sandford – Porthos (*Stanley J. Sandford)
Gino Corrado – Aramis

Production background
The 1929 part-talkie version, titled The Iron Mask, was the first talking picture starring Douglas Fairbanks, though until recently it was usually shown in a silent version. The film stars Fairbanks as d'Artagnan, Marguerite De La Motte as his beloved Constance (who is killed early in the film to protect the secret that the King has a twin brother), Nigel De Brulier as the scheming Cardinal Richelieu, and Ullrich Haupt as the evil Count De Rochefort. William Bakewell appeared as the royal twins.

Fairbanks lavished resources on his final silent film, with the knowledge he was bidding farewell to his beloved genre.  This marks the only time where Fairbanks's character dies at the end of the film, with the closing scene depicting the once-again youthful Musketeers all reunited in death, moving on (as the final title says) to find "greater adventure beyond".

The original 1929 release, though mostly a silent film, actually had a soundtrack: two short speeches delivered by Fairbanks, and a musical score with a few sound effects. In 1952, it was reissued, with the intertitles removed and a narration voiced by Douglas Fairbanks, Jr. added. The original film included a scene in which d'Artagnan tells the young King of an embarrassing adventure involving him and the three musketeers. The story is told in flashback but the 1952 version has it in chronological order with the scene with the King cut out.

In 1999, with the cooperation of the Library of Congress and the Museum of Modern Art, Kino Video released a DVD of the 1929 version. A complete set of Vitaphone disks exists for this picture. However, only a small portion of the original sound from these was synchronized with film footage, namely the two short sequences in which Douglas Fairbanks speaks. The rest of the soundtrack, which contained a Synchronized Score along with sound effects was not used as this would make the DVD public domain. (The copyright has expired on the original 1929 sound version.) For this DVD reissue, therefore, a new score was commissioned from composer Carl Davis. The Kino disc also includes excerpts from the 1952 version, some outtakes from the original filming, and some textual background material from the program for the 1999 premiere showing of the reconstruction. A complete restoration of the original sound version has yet to be released.

Reception and legacy
Fairbanks Biographer Jeffrey Vance has opined, "As a valedictory to the silent screen, The Iron Mask is unsurpassed. In one of his few departures from playing a young man—and with fewer characteristic stunts—Fairbanks conjures up his most multi-dimensional and moving screen portrayal in a film that is perhaps the supreme achievement of its genre."

References

Further reading
Vance, Jeffrey. Douglas Fairbanks. Berkeley, CA: University of California Press, 2008. .

External links

 – 1929

1929 films
1920s adventure drama films
American silent feature films
American adventure drama films
American black-and-white films
1920s English-language films
American swashbuckler films
Transitional sound films
Films based on The Vicomte of Bragelonne: Ten Years Later
Films directed by Allan Dwan
Cultural depictions of Cardinal Richelieu
Cultural depictions of Louis XIII
Cultural depictions of Louis XIV
1920s historical adventure films
American historical adventure films
1929 drama films
Man in the Iron Mask
Twins in fiction
1920s American films
Silent American drama films
Silent adventure drama films
Silent historical adventure films